Yvan Chiffre (3 March 1936 – 27 September 2016) was a French director, producer, and stunt coordinator. He is the father of Philippe Chiffre, Romain Chiffre and the grand father of César Chiffre.

Biography

He was the stunt coordinator of Thunderball and Triple Cross by Terence Young, Is Paris Burning? by René Clément, Z by Costa Gavras, Hotel Paradiso by Peter Glenville.

He was also the official stunt double of Jean Marais and Alain Delon, was stunt man on the Longest Day, and stunt double of Cary Grant in Charade, Sterling Hayden in Poppies Are Also Flowers, Eddie Constantine in Lucky Jo and many others...

He also contributed to major French films like Zorro by Duccio Tessari, La Grande Vadrouille by Gérard Oury, Le Cercle Rouge by Jean-Pierre Melville, and more than 200 others.

In 1992, he published an autobiography A l'ombre des stars, about his stuntman life.

In 2014, he received in Paris the UNESCO prize. 

In 2017, the Academy Award, Oscars In Memoriam honors Yvan Chiffre for his life achievement.

Filmography

Actor 

1959: Rue des prairies - (uncredited)
1961: The Three Musketeers (by Bernard Borderie)
1961: Le Miracle des loups (by André Hunebelle) - Un baladin (uncredited)
1962: The Longest Day (by Ken Annakin, Andrew Marton, Bernhard Wicki, Gerd Oswald and Darryl F. Zanuck) - Paratrooper (uncredited)
1962: The Mysteries of Paris (by André Hunebelle) - Un argousin (uncredited)
1962: Le Chevalier de Pardaillan (by Bernard Borderie) - Un garde (uncredited)
1962: Your Turn, Darling (by Bernard Borderie)
1963: OSS 117 Is Unleashed (by André Hunebelle) - Agent Thibaud
1964: Anatomy of a Marriage: My Days with Jean-Marc (by André Cayatte) - Christian
1964: Anatomy of a Marriage: My Days with Françoise (by André Cayatte) - Christian
1964: The Black Tulip (by Christian-Jaque)
1964: Hardi Pardaillan! (by Bernard Borderie) - Yvon
1964: Nick Carter va tout casser (by Henri Decoin) - Un homme de main de Li-Hang
1964: Une souris chez les hommes (by Jacques Poitrenaud) - Un patineur (uncredited)
1964: Fantômas (by André Hunebelle) - Un homme de main de Fantômas (uncredited)
1964: Lucky Jo (by Michel Deville) - Un bagarreur au bar du boulevard de la Madeleine (uncredited)
1965: Ces dames s'en mêlent (by Raoul André) - Loulou
1965: Le Majordome (by Jean Delannoy) - Paulo
1965: Furia à Bahia pour OSS 117 (by André Hunebelle) - Un homme de main
1965: Coplan FX 18 casse tout (by Riccardo Freda) - Un homme de main (uncredited)
1965: Fantômas se déchaîne (by André Hunebelle) - Un homme de Fantômas
1966: The Poppy Is Also a Flower (by Terence Young) - (uncredited)
1966: Le Solitaire passe à l'attaque (by Ralph Habib)
1966: Sale temps pour les mouches (by Guy Lefranc)
1966: La Grande Vadrouille (by Gérard Oury)
1967: Two Weeks in September (by Serge Bourguignon) - Man on the Motorcycle (uncredited)
1968: À tout casser (by John Berry)
1968: Les Cracks (by Alex Joffé)
1969: Le Clan des Siciliens (by Henri Verneuil) - Un inspecteur (uncredited)
1970: Le Temps des loups (by Sergio Gobbi) - L'homme de main du receleur (uncredited)
1969: Z (by Costa-Gavras)
1969: Borsalino (by Jacques Deray)
1970: Le Cercle rouge (by Jean-Pierre Melville) - Un policier
1971: Doucement les basses (by Jacques Deray)
1971: Le drapeau noir flotte sur la marmite - Bit
1973: Défense de savoir - L'equipe
1974: Les Quatre Charlots mousquetaires (by André Hunebelle) - Un garde du cardinal (uncredited)
1974: Les Charlots en folie : À nous quatre Cardinal ! (by André Hunebelle) - Garde qui louche
1974: Borsalino & Co (by Jacques Deray)
1974: La moutarde me monte au nez (by Claude Zidi)
1974: Lancelot du lac (by Robert Bresson)
1975: Zorro (by Duccio Tessari) - Thug (uncredited)
1980: Du blues plein la tête (by Hervé Palud) - Le boucher
1984: Le fou du roi - Taillevent
1984: Cheech & Chong's The Corsican Brothers - Tax collector #1 (final film role)

Television
1965-1966: Thierry la Fronde (série TV) (by Pierre Goutas) - Robert / L'homme au couteau
1966: Le Chevalier d'Harmental (feuilleton TV) (by Jean-Pierre Decourt) - Ravanne

Director 
 1975 : Bons Baisers de Hong Kong
 1984 : Le Fou du roi
 1989 : President's target

References

 

French stunt performers
French film directors
1936 births
2016 deaths